The Congress of the Jewish Religious Organizations and Associations in Russia (CJROAR) was established in February 1993.  CJROAR links 100 Jewish organizations in 68 Russian cities. This body possesses no administrative powers, but rather performs consulting, coordinating and representative functions. Its primary activities are designing and conducting religious seminars, preparing staff for the work in communities, introducing the Jewish population to national traditions, as well as educational and publishing activity.

The administrative bodies of CJROAR are the Rabbinate and the Public Council.

Activity
At the beginning of the 2006 school year, CJROAR issued a press-release in which it appealed to Jews of Russia and heads of Jewish communities with a request to inform the Chief Rabbi of Russia about Jewish students being required to study the "Basics of the Christian Orthodox culture", the assignment of examinations in Shabbat and other problems dealing with difficulties in adhering to Jewish religious norms.

References

External links
Official website of CJROAR

Jewish organizations based in Russia